Edmund Henry Pendleton (1788 – February 25, 1862) was a U.S. Representative from New York.

Born in Savannah, Georgia, Pendleton received a liberal schooling as a youth. He graduated from Columbia College in 1805, studied law, was admitted to the bar in 1809, and practiced in Hyde Park, New York.

He was judge of Dutchess County, New York from 1830 to 1840. He was elected as an Anti-Jacksonian to the Twenty-second Congress (March 4, 1831 – March 4, 1833).
He died in New York City on February 25, 1862, and was interred in St. James' Churchyard in Hyde Park.

References 

1788 births
1862 deaths
Columbia College (New York) alumni
National Republican Party members of the United States House of Representatives from New York (state)
New York (state) lawyers
New York (state) state court judges
Burials in New York (state)
People from Hyde Park, New York
19th-century American politicians
19th-century American judges
19th-century American lawyers